The atomic de Broglie microscope (also atomic nanoscope, neutral beam microscope, or scanning helium microscope when helium is used as the probing atom) is an imaging system which is expected to provide resolution at the nanometer scale. It is sometimes referred to as a "nanoscope."

History
The resolution of optical microscopes is limited to a few hundred nanometers by the wave properties of the light.

The idea of imaging with atoms instead of light is widely discussed in the literature since the past century. Atom optics using neutral atoms instead of light could provide resolution as good as the electron microscope and be completely non-destructive, because short wavelengths on the order of a nanometer can be realized at low energy of the probing particles. "It follows that a helium microscope with nanometer resolution is possible. A helium atom microscope will be [a] unique non-destructive tool for reflection or transmission microscopy."

Focusing of neutral atoms
Currently, the atom-optic imaging systems are not competitive with electron microscopy and various types of near-field probe. The main problem in the optics of atomic beams for an imaging system is the focusing element. There is no material transparent to the beam of low-energy atoms.  A Fresnel zone plate  
 and evanescent field lens 
 were suggested, as well as various atomic mirrors.
Such mirrors use the quantum reflection by Casimir–van der Waals potential tails.

Ridged mirrors 
Recently, the performance of solid-state atomic mirrors was greatly enhanced with so-called ridged mirrors (or Fresnel diffraction mirrors). The specular reflection of an atomic wave from a ridged mirror can be interpreted as spatial Zeno effect.
At the appropriate ellipsoidal profile, such a mirror could be used for focusing of an atomic beam into a spot of some tens of nanometers; the scattering of atoms from this spot brings the image of the object, like in the scanning confocal microscope, scanning electron microscope, or scanning probe microscopy.

The scheme shown in the picture is one possibility. A similar scheme is posted at the homepage of the University of Cambridge; see an additional list of references there. Such an imaging system could also be realized with holographic, Fresnel diffraction, and evanescent wave systems. Some of such systems may become competitive with established methods of visualization and measuring of nano-objects. See the overview at Nanowiki (Nanotechnology).

See also 
 Atom optics
 Atomic mirror
 Quantum reflection
 Ridged mirror
 Grazing angle
 Zeno effect
 Matter wave
 Scanning helium ion microscope (SHIM, HeIM or HIM)

References 

Microscopes
Nanotechnology
Atomic, molecular, and optical physics